Rafael Menjivar can refer to:
Rafael Menjívar Larín (1935–2000), Salvadoran economist and politician
Rafael Menjívar Ochoa (1959–2011), Salvadoran writer, novelist, journalist and translator, the former's son